Neal Patterson Stadium is a soccer-specific stadium on the campus of Oklahoma State University in Stillwater, Oklahoma. The stadium hosts the Oklahoma State women's soccer team. The facility opened in 1996, and dedicated 2018. A $20 million project, the stadium is named for its major benefactor and Oklahoma State alumnus, the late Neal Patterson.

The current capacity since the 2018 renovation is 2,500.

References

External links 
 Neal Patterson Stadium

Tourist attractions in Stillwater, Oklahoma
Buildings and structures in Stillwater, Oklahoma